Sarracenia minor, also known as the hooded pitcherplant, is a perennial, terrestrial, rhizomatous, herbaceous, carnivorous plant in the genus Sarracenia. Like all the Sarracenia, it is native to North America.

Etymology
In 1788, the first description of S. minor was written by Thomas Walter. The specific epithet minor means "small" and refers to the typical size of the pitchers. The common name refers to the characteristic lid of this species.

Description

The tubes are mostly green throughout, but can also be reddish in the upper part. Flowering occurs from late March to mid-May. Flowers are yellow in colour and odorless. Over a hundred seeds are produced by a capsule.

Sarracenia minor and S. psittacina are the only species in the genus to employ domed pitchers with translucent white patches that allow light to enter.  It has been suggested that the light shining through these patches attracts flying insects further into the pitcher and away from the pitcher's mouth in a similar manner to Darlingtonia californica and two Nepenthes species, N. aristolochioides and N. klossii. The pitcher is filled with water and enzymes produced by the plant and helpful in the digestion of prey. In the wild, Sarracenia minor seems very attractive to ants, although it also attracts and eats a wide range of flying insects.

Distribution
This plant can be found in areas of northern and central Florida and in Georgia up to the southern part of North Carolina. The species exhibits the southernmost range of any member of the genus Sarracenia extending to fragmented populations surrounding Lake Okeechobee in south-central Florida.

Habitat
It grows in swampy environments poor in nutrients such as nitrogen or phosphorus.

Infraspecific taxa
Sarracenia minor var. minor
Sarracenia minor var. okefenokeensis Schnell (2002)

Synonyms
Sarracenia adunca Sm. (1804)
 ?Sarracenia galeata Bartr. (1791) nom.nud.
 Sarracenia lacunosa Bartr. (1794)[=S. leucophylla/S. minor]
 Sarracenia minor auct. non Walt.: Sweet (1832) [=S. rubra]
 Sarracenia variolaris Michx. (1803)

Gallery

References

External links
 CITES
 Gelinaud
 Dionee

minor
Carnivorous plants of North America
Endemic flora of the United States
Flora of Florida
Flora of Georgia (U.S. state)
Flora of North Carolina
Least concern flora of the United States
Plants described in 1788
Flora of South Carolina